Dysart High School is a high school in El Mirage, Arizona under the jurisdiction of the Dysart Unified School District.

History
As of the end of the 2014–2015 school year, Dysart High School has had 1,657 students enrolled. The total faculty of the school is 108 (81 teachers, 15 teachers aides, 4 administrators, and 9 professional staff).

A school has a "site council", which consists of two school administrators, two non-certified employees, two teachers, two parents, one member of the community, and two students.  The responsibilities of this council are to facilitate school improvement, student achievement, school safety, student discipline, and communication with the community.

Academics

The school has been designated by the Arizona Learns Achievement Profile as "Performing Plus".

The school has a graduation rate of 97% and awards over $700,000 in scholarships annually.  In addition the school received over $600,000 in a 21st Century Grant and nearly $100,000 in a Gear-up grant; this money is used to fund mentoring, tutoring, summer enrichment and parental involvement programs.

Signature programs

 AVID: Advancement Via Individual Determination - International program to increase student performance.
 Industrial Trades: Automotive Technology - Designed to provide students the opportunity to gain knowledge and experience to diagnose and repair problems of a vehicle.
 Cambridge Program
 JROTC - Helps prepare high school students for various responsible leadership jobs of choice in the civilian workforce, private enterprise or military service.
 Communications Media: Photo Imaging - Gain experience with the latest graphic software, digital cameras, and studio equipment.

References

External links
 Official school website
 Band Website

Educational institutions established in 1963
Public high schools in Arizona
Schools in Maricopa County, Arizona
1963 establishments in Arizona
Education in Surprise, Arizona